Maid Marian is Robin Hood's love interest in the standard form of the legend as it emerged in the 16th century.

Maid Marian can also refer to:

 Maid Marian (novel), an 1822 novel by Thomas Love Peacock
 Maid Marian and Her Merry Men, a BBC television series
 Maid Marian (locomotive), a preserved steam locomotive
 Maid Marian Entertainment, a developer of browser-based video games